The 27th Los Angeles Film Critics Association Awards, honoring the best in film for 2001, were given on 15 December 2001.

Winners

Best Picture:
In the Bedroom
Runner-up: Mulholland Drive
Best Director:
David Lynch – Mulholland Drive
Runner-up: Robert Altman – Gosford Park
Best Actor:
Denzel Washington – Training Day
Runner-up: Tom Wilkinson – In the Bedroom
Best Actress:
Sissy Spacek – In the Bedroom
Runner-up: Naomi Watts – Mulholland Drive
Best Supporting Actor:
Jim Broadbent – Iris and Moulin Rouge!
Runner-up: Ben Kingsley – Sexy Beast
Best Supporting Actress:
Kate Winslet – Iris
Runner-up: Helen Mirren – Gosford Park and Last Orders
Best Screenplay:
Christopher Nolan – Memento
Runner-up: Terry Zwigoff and Daniel Clowes – Ghost World
Best Cinematography:
Roger Deakins – The Man Who Wasn't There
Runner-up: Christopher Doyle and Mark Lee Ping Bin – In the Mood for Love (Fa yeung nin wa)
Best Production Design:
Catherine Martin – Moulin Rouge!
Runner-up: Grant Major – The Lord of the Rings: The Fellowship of the Ring
Best Music Score:
Howard Shore – The Lord of the Rings: The Fellowship of the Ring
Runner-up: Stephen Trask – Hedwig and the Angry Inch
Best Foreign-Language Film:
No Man's Land • Bosnia-Herzegovina
Runner-up: In the Mood for Love (Fa yeung nin wa) • Hong Kong / France
Best Non-Fiction Film:
The Gleaners and I (Les glaneurs et la glaneuse)
Best Animation:
Shrek
Runner-up: Monsters, Inc.
The Douglas Edwards Experimental/Independent Film/Video Award:
The Beaver Trilogy
New Generation Award:
John Cameron Mitchell – Hedwig and the Angry Inch
Career Achievement Award:
Ennio Morricone
Special Citation:
Joe Grant

References

External links
 27th Annual Los Angeles Film Critics Association Awards

2001
Los Angeles Film Critics Association Awards
Los Angeles Film Critics Association Awards
Los Angeles Film Critics Association Awards
Los Angeles Film Critics Association Awards